The 1925 Cork Senior Hurling Championship was the 37th staging of the Cork Senior Hurling Championship since its establishment by the Cork County Board in 1887. The draw for the opening round fixtures took place on 11 March 1925. The championship began on 5 April 1925 and ended on 23 August 1925.

Blackrock were the defending champions.

On 23 August 1925, Blackrock won the championship following a 6-4 to 2-3 defeat of St. Finbarr’s in the final. This was their 17th championship title overall and their second title in succession.

Team changes

To Championship

Promoted from the Cork Intermediate Hurling Championship
 Passage

Results

First round

Collins received a bye in this round.

Second round

Cloughduv received a bye in this round.

Semi-finals

Final

References

Cork Senior Hurling Championship
Cork Senior Hurling Championship